Halamphora coffeiformis is a species of diatoms belonging to the family Amphipleuraceae.

Synonyms: 
 Amphora coffeiformis (C.Agardh) Kützing 1844
 Amphora coffeaeformis (C.Agardh) Kützing, 1844

References

Naviculales